Shir Khan (also Romanized as Shīr Khān) is a village in Tabas Rural District, in the Central District of Khoshab County, Razavi Khorasan Province, Iran. At the 2006 census, its population was 845, in 212 families.

References 

Populated places in Khoshab County